Einat Kalisch-Rotem (born 3 September 1970) is an Israeli urban planner and politician serving as mayor of Haifa since 2018. She is the first female mayor to lead any of the three major cities in Israel.

Career
Kalisch first ran for Mayor of Haifa in 2013. She won 14% of the vote, coming in third place behind Yaakov Borowski and incumbent Yona Yahav.

She was convicted in March 2018 of violating the Planning and Construction Law in the Court for Local Affairs in Hadera, regarding the construction of a private house in Zichron Yaakov, which was built without a building permit and fined 30,000 ILS.

In the municipal elections of 2018 held in October, she and her party were disqualified from running in the elections according to the decision of the Elections Administration, after the Labor Party's lawyer signed both her forms and those of the "Lovers of Haifa" list run by Yisrael Savyon of the Labor Party. This created a situation in which two lists represented the Labor Party in the elections in the city, in violation of the election law. In response, Kalisch-Rotem and several organizations submitted a petition to the Haifa District Court, but the petition was rejected. In the appeal filed with the High Court of Justice, her appeal was accepted, and it was determined that she was entitled to contend because she acted in good faith.

In the 2018 Haifa mayoral election, she defeated Yona Yahav with 56% of the vote.

References

External links
 

1970 births
Living people
Mayors of Haifa
People from Haifa
Israeli Jews
Women mayors of places in Israel
Technion – Israel Institute of Technology alumni
ETH Zurich alumni
Israeli architects
Israeli female karateka